Patrick J. Kyle (November 4, 1854 – October 28, 1929) was a United States Navy sailor and a recipient of America's highest military decoration—the Medal of Honor

For his conduct on this occasion, he was awarded the Medal of Honor.

Kyle died at age 74, and was interred in New Calvary Cemetery, Mattapan, Massachusetts.

Medal of Honor citation
Rank and organization: Landsman, U.S. Navy. Born: 1855, Ireland. Accredited to: Massachusetts.

Citation:

For rescuing from drowning a shipmate from the U.S.S. Quinnebaug, at Port Mahon, Menorca, 13 March 1879.

See also
List of Medal of Honor recipients
List of Medal of Honor recipients in non-combat incidents

References

1854 births
1929 deaths
Irish emigrants to the United States (before 1923)
United States Navy Medal of Honor recipients
People from Boston
United States Navy sailors
Irish-born Medal of Honor recipients
Irish sailors in the United States Navy
Non-combat recipients of the Medal of Honor
Catholics from Massachusetts